Cosner's Corner is a village in Spotsylvania County, Virginia. It is located at the intersection of U.S. Route 17 and U.S. Route 1 just south of Fredericksburg.

Geography of Spotsylvania County, Virginia